Orlando Ruíz (born 5 October 1935) is a Cuban fencer. He competed in the individual and team foil and team épée events at the 1968 Summer Olympics.

References

1935 births
Living people
Cuban male fencers
Olympic fencers of Cuba
Fencers at the 1968 Summer Olympics
People from Villa Clara Province
Pan American Games medalists in fencing
Medalists at the 1967 Pan American Games
Pan American Games bronze medalists for Cuba
Fencers at the 1967 Pan American Games